Gerald Mayr is a German palaeontologist who is Curator of Ornithology at the Senckenberg Research Institute in Frankfurt am Main, Hesse. He has published extensively on fossil birds, especially the Paleogene avifauna of Europe. He is an expert on the Eocene fauna of the Messel pit.

In 2022, alongside Thomas Lechner and Madelaine Böhme, Mayr described Allgoviachen tortonica, a new genus and species of anatid bird from the Hammerschmiede clay pits of Bavaria, Germany.

References

German paleontologists
German ornithologists
Paleozoologists
Living people
Year of birth missing (living people)